Maximag was the name of a Swiss automobile, produced by Motosacoche, based at Carouge, a suburb of Geneva, from 1923 till 1928.

By the time it embarked on automobile manufacturing, the company had already established itself as a maker of engines and motor cycles.

From 1924 the cars were also assembled in Lyon which enabled them to be sold in France without being penalized by the tariff barriers that separated the national markets of the two countries in question.

The cars
The car sat on a  wheelbase and was priced by Maximag at 14,850 francs when fitted with a small 2-seater "torpedo" body.

The same car was on display two years later at the 20th Paris Motor Show in October 1926.   Engine displacement and wheelbase were unchanged but now, in addition to the sportily styled  "torpedo" body, the car was available with what was listed as a 2-door "conduite intérieure" body.  ("Conduite intérieure" was a slightly old-fashioned and upmarket designation, inherited from the horse-drawn carriage business, for what in this context was a small conventionally boxy saloon/sedan.)

Reading list 
Harald Linz, Halwart Schrader: Die Internationale Automobil-Enzyklopädie. United Soft Media Verlag, München 2008, . (German)
George Nick Georgano (Chefredakteur): The Beaulieu Encyclopedia of the Automobile. Volume 3: P–Z. Fitzroy Dearborn Publishers, Chicago 2001, . (English)
George Nick Georgano: Autos. Encyclopédie complète. 1885 à nos jours. Courtille, Paris 1975. (French)

Sources and notes 

Defunct motor vehicle manufacturers of France
Cars of Switzerland
Vehicle manufacturing companies established in 1923
Vehicle manufacturing companies disestablished in 1928
Swiss companies established in 1923
1928 disestablishments in Switzerland